The Office of Infrastructure and Logistics is a Directorate-General of the European Commission. The Office for Infrastructure and Logistics, Brussels (OIB) and the Office of Infrastructure and Logistics, Luxembourg (OIL) were created according to a Commission decision of November 6, 2002.

Office for Infrastructure and logistics – Brussels (OIB)
The mission of OIB is to ensure the implementation of all actions connected with the accommodation of personnel, the management of social infrastructure and the logistics of the institution.

Office for Infrastructure and Logistics - Luxembourg (OIL)
OIL is responsible for the following services for all Commission departments in Luxembourg:
The housing of staff
The provision and management of social welfare infrastructure
Logistics
Compliance with health and safety requirements in the buildings

External links
Office for Infrastructure and logistics – Brussels (OIB)
Office of Infrastructure and Logistics - Luxembourg (OIL)
 European Union Laws & Regulation on 3rd Party Logistics

Directorates-General in the European Commission